Tayfur Ata Sökmen (1892 – 3 March 1980) was the president of the Hatay State  during its existence (5 September 1938 – 23 July 1939).

Life
He was born in Gaziantep. He graduated from the Rüştiye (high school)  in Kırıkhan. During  French Mandate in Hatay, he participated in opposition movement. But when he was sentenced with death penalty he escaped to Turkey. Although he was pardoned in 1926, next year he escaped to Turkey once more. In 1935 he was elected MP from Antalya Province. When Hatay was declared an independent state, Sökmen was elected as the president of the Republic. However soon Hatay merged to Turkey. In later years Sökmen was elected MP from Antalya and Hatay Province up to 1954.

According to Turkish constitution of 1961, former presidents had a seat in the  Turkish Senate. Being the former president of Hatay, he became a permanent member of the Senate. However he resigned in 1975. He died in İstanbul.

Sources

 Sökmen, Tayfur: , Ankara 1992, 

1980 deaths
History of Hatay Province
1939 in Turkey
1892 births
People from Gaziantep